The 1916 Idaho football team represented the University of Idaho in the 1916 college football season.  Idaho was led by first-year head coach Wilfred C. Bleamaster and played as an independent; they joined the Pacific Coast Conference six years later  Idaho had three home games in Moscow on campus at MacLean Field, with none in Boise.

Idaho dropped a third consecutive shutout to Washington State in the Battle of the Palouse, falling  at Rogers Field in Pullman. Seven years later, the Vandals won the first of three consecutive, their only three-peat in the rivalry series.

Idaho opened with five losses, then won three road games in six days for a  record.

Schedule

 The Little Brown Stein trophy for the Montana game debuted 22 years later in 1938
 Games were played on Friday (Whitman at Walla Walla), Monday (Idaho Tech at Pocatello),and Thursday (Utah Agricultural at Logan on Thanksgiving)

References

External links
Gem of the Mountains: 1918 University of Idaho yearbook (spring 1917) – 1916 football season
Official game program: Idaho at Washington State – November 4, 1916
Go Mighty Vandals – 1916 football season
Idaho Argonaut – student newspaper – 1916 editions

Idaho
Idaho Vandals football seasons
Idaho football